Thermidarctia thirmida is a moth in the subfamily Arctiinae. It was described by Hering in 1926. It is found in Brazil.

References

Moths described in 1926
Arctiinae